The Angostura Dam (officially known as the Belisario Domínguez Dam) is an embankment dam and hydroelectric power station on the Grijalva River near Venustiano Carranza in Chiapas, Mexico. The dam's power plant contains 5 x 180 MW, 3 x 310 MW Francis turbine-generators. Initial construction on the dam began in 1969 and foundation work in 1971. On May 8, 1974, the dam began to impound its reservoir. On 14 July 1976, the dam's first generator went online.

References

Dams in Mexico
Hydroelectric power stations in Mexico
Embankment dams
Dams completed in 1974
Dams on the Grijalva River